François Favrat is a French film director, screenwriter and occasional actor, best known for directing The Role of Her Life and Boomerang.

Filmography

As filmmaker

As actor

References

External links
 

Living people
French film directors
French screenwriters
Year of birth missing (living people)
Place of birth missing (living people)